Paul William Kaeser High School is a high school in Fort Smith, Northwest Territories, Canada. The school is overseen by the Fort Smith District Education Authority and administered by the South Slave Divisional Education Council. It provides secondary education services to students from Fort Smith as well as the nearby Salt River First Nation and Smith's Landing First Nation.

The school is named after Paul William Kaeser, a Fort Smith entrepreneur who opened a grocery store in Fort Smith in 1947.

Recognition
In 2012, the current principal of the school, Al Karasiuk, was named one of Canada's Outstanding Principal by The Learning Partnership, a Toronto-based NGO

References

External links
Paul William Kaeser High School at the South Slave Divisional Education Council

High schools in the Northwest Territories